The 1977 Washington Huskies football team represented the University of Washington in the 1977 NCAA Division I football season as a member of the Pacific-8 Conference (Pac-8).

The Huskies were fourteen-point underdogs to #4 Michigan, but upset the Wolverines

Schedule

† Games were subsequently vacated or forfeited to Washington

Roster

Game summaries

Game 9 at California

USC

Washington State

NFL Draft selections
Two University of Washington Huskies were selected in the 1978 NFL Draft, which lasted twelve rounds with 334 selections.

 Quarterback Warren Moon played for the Edmonton Eskimos (CFL) from 1978 to 1983 and made his NFL debut with the Houston Oilers in 1984.

References

External links
 YouTube – UW video – "The James Gang Arrives" (1977 season)

Washington
Washington Huskies football seasons
Pac-12 Conference football champion seasons
Rose Bowl champion seasons
Washington Huskies football